Léon Geismar was a French politician and colonial governor of French West Africa.

Early life 
He was born in Alsace to a pious Jewish family. His father was a winemaker, and his ancestors included General Gédéon Geismar.

Life and career 
He initially served for the German army in World War One, but deserted to France in September 1914. He received several awards for his actions during the war, including the Escapees' Medal and the Volunteer Combatant's Cross.

After the war ended, Geismar studied for university and then moved to Dakar shortly after. His importance eventually grew to the point where he became Governor General of French West Africa. He received several honours during his time in Africa, including the Black Star, Dragon of Annam, and finally a Knight of the Legion of Honour, the highest order of merit in France.

Under the Vichy regime, Geismar was subjected to extreme persecution, and told by authorities that he would have to give up all his posts within a month. He was then demoted from Governor general to Treasurer for Ivory Coast.

Personal life 

He was married to a Malagasy Catholic, Marguerite Mouneyres, a descendant of Ranavalo III, and had one daughter. Geismar converted to Catholicism after marriage, but was still treated as a Jew by Vichy authorities. Geismar was fluent in six languages (including French, German, Hausa, and English) and had at least some knowledge of Italian, Portuguese, and Dutch.

Geismar's views on the Zionist movement remain unclear, however, in 1940 he expressed doubt in a letter to his Zionist sister that a Jewish state would be possible given that the Middle East had "become an Arab state". Besides this letter, there are no other records of Geismar stating his opinion on Zionism again.

Works 

 Recueil des coutumes civiles des races du Sénégal : établi par L. Geismar ...
 Rapport général sur l'artisanat indigène : congrès international et intercolonial de la Société indigène, 5 au 10 octobre : Exposition coloniale internationale de Paris, 1931
 Rapport général sur la protection de la vie locale : congrès international et intercolonial de la Société indigène, 5 au 10 octobre : Exposition coloniale internationale de Paris, 1931

See also 

 History of the Jews in Africa

References 

Chevaliers of the Légion d'honneur
1895 births
1944 deaths
Jewish French politicians
Governors of French West Africa
Deaths in Morocco
People from Alsace
Converts to Roman Catholicism from Judaism
Alsatian Jews
French military personnel of World War I
Recipients of the Order of the Dragon of Annam
French Jewish military personnel